Montfaucon may refer to:

People
 Amadeus II of Montfaucon (1130–1195), lord of Montfaucon and count of Montbéliard 
 Bernard de Montfaucon (1655–1741), French monk, early palaeographer and archaeologist
 Henry of Montfaucon (before 1318–1367), lord of Montfaucon and count of Montbéliard 
 Stephen of Montfaucon (1325–1397), lord of Montfaucon and count of Montbéliard

Places

Switzerland
 Montfaucon, Switzerland, in the canton of Jura

France
 Montfaucon, Aisne, in the Aisne département
 Montfaucon, Doubs, in the Doubs département
 Montfaucon, Gard, in the Gard département
 Montfaucon, Lot, in the Lot département
 Montfaucon-d'Argonne, in the Meuse département
 Montfaucon-en-Velay, in the Haute-Loire département
 Montfaucon-Montigné, in the Maine-et-Loire département
 Canton of Montfaucon-Montigné

Other uses
 Battle of Montfaucon or Meuse-Argonne Offensive, World War I battle
 Gibbet of Montfaucon, the gibbet of the kings of France from the 13th century to 1760
 Montfaucon American Monument, commemorating a World War I victory, in Lorraine, France

See also
 Monfaucon (disambiguation)